Joseph Veloce (born 23 April 1989) is a Canadian cyclist. He was born in St. Catharines, Ontario. He competed in keirin at the 2012 Summer Olympics in London. He also competed in the keirin, the men's sprint and the men's team sprint at the 2014 Commonwealth Games.  Joseph Veloce broke the Canadian record for the flying 200 m Time Trial on 9 February 2013 in Mexico City with a time of 9.802 seconds.

References

External links

1989 births
Living people
Canadian male cyclists
Cyclists at the 2012 Summer Olympics
Cyclists at the 2014 Commonwealth Games
Commonwealth Games competitors for Canada
Cyclists at the 2015 Pan American Games
Cyclists from Ontario
Olympic cyclists of Canada
Sportspeople from St. Catharines
Pan American Games medalists in cycling
Pan American Games gold medalists for Canada
Medalists at the 2015 Pan American Games